The epiglottic valleculae are paired spaces between the root of the tongue and anterior surface of the epiglottis. Each vallecula is bordered medially by the median glossoepiglottic fold and laterally by the lateral glossoepiglottic fold.

The valleculae can collect saliva to prevent initiation of the swallowing reflex.

The vallecula is an important reference landmark used during intubation of the trachea.  The procedure requires the blade-tip of a Macintosh-style laryngoscope to be placed as far as possible into the vallecula in order to facilitate directly visualizing the glottis.

Additional Images

References 

Human head and neck
Human throat